Glomstein is a village in the municipality of Nøtterøy, Norway. Its population (SSB 2005) is 382.

Villages in Vestfold og Telemark
Nøtterøy